Thiruveezhimizhalai is a village in the Kudavasal taluk of Tiruvarur district, Tamil Nadu, India.

Demographics 

As per the 2001 census, Thiruveezhimizhalai  had a total population of 3,022 with 1,507 male and 1,515 female. The sex ratio was 1,005. The literacy rate was 74.8.

References 

 

Villages in Tiruvarur district